is the ceremony where an apprentice geisha graduates to become a geisha. 

This occasion is marked by a number of ceremonies and changes in appearance, such as wearing a plain white collar on the underkimono instead of the embroidered red-and-white attached collar worn by apprentices. The hairstyle worn by an apprentice also changes: from a variety of different styles constructed with her own hair to the -style wig worn by geisha.

References 
, page 184 
 page 159

Geisha
Rites of passage